Sir John Gay Alleyne, 1st Baronet (28 April 1724 – 1801) Barbadian politician and the first of the Alleyne baronets which still exists today.

Background 

Alleyne descended from the first settlers on Barbados and was born at St James as the second son of John Alleyne and his wife Mary Terrill, daughter of William Terrill. On 19 October 1746 at St James Church, Barbados, he married Cristen Dottin, fourth daughter of Anne Jordan Dottin and Joseph Dottin, with whom he had a son. After her death in 1782, Alleyne remarried his forty years younger cousin Jane, daughter of Abel Alleyne, on 29 June 1786. With her, he had five daughters and two more sons.

Career 

In 1757, Alleyne was elected for the Parish of St. Andrew to the Parliament of Barbados, a seat he held for the next forty years, with only a break in 1771. Already after a decade in the Parliament, he became Speaker of the House of Assembly of Barbados, serving until 1770 and after another two years was reappointed until 1779.  Despite being a slaveowner, Alleyne publicly voiced opinions unpopular to the planter class at that time, declaring in the House of Assembly that he disapproved of the system of slavery, "an unhappy sight which leaves an immense debt upon us to clear the obligation of human nature".  Alleyne was created a baronet, of Four Hills, in the Island of Barbados on 6 April 1769.

Death and legacy 

Alleyne's wife died in 1800 and he survived her until the following year. Both older sons having predeceased him, he was succeeded in the baronetcy by his third son Reynold.

In 1770, Alleyne financially laid the groundwork for establishing The Seminary, a school for "the maintenance, support, and education of poor boys". While originally intended for white boys, it received permission to also admit young boys of colour. Eventually renamed The Alleyne School, it continues today and was the first government co-educational secondary school in Barbados.

Mount Gay Distilleries Ltd., makers of the world's oldest known rum brand still in existence, was renamed from its earlier name of Mount Gilboa Plantation/Distillery. Upon Alleyne's death, his close friend John Sober who had employed him as manager of the company, posthumously changed the name of the company in honour of him.

See also

Notes

References 

 
 
 
 
 
 
 

1724 births
1801 deaths
Colony of Barbados people
Baronets in the Baronetage of Great Britain
Speakers of the House Assembly of Barbados
Members of the House of Assembly of Barbados